The Art of... is a series of art books which showcase the evolution of artwork throughout the development of popular and critically acclaimed animated films and series. They have been published by different companies including Chronicle Books, Viz Media, Disney Editions and Hyperion Books.

The books have generally been highly praised and considered essential coffee table merchandise to supplement their respective films.

Titles

Films

Series

Critical reception
The Animation World Network described  The Art of DreamWorks Animation as "a breathtakingly lovely catalogue of every animated film that...is like a tour through the Louvre of modern cinematic animation". Indiwire explained that the Home edition, in contrast to the other books in The Art Of... series contains "finished artwork or very late concept work [which] is at least equal to art from prototypical and developmental stages." Rotoscopers noted that art books in the series "are usually also ‘making of’ books that teach the reader about how a movie was made." Due to the sheer number of The Art of... titles, Martin Godman of Animation Scoop wrote "When I review an “Art Of” book today, I tend to look at what sets the book apart from similar products; a difference that makes the book worth adding to a library and perusing years after the film itself has departed the theaters."

References

External links
 Ringling College Library Guides: "Art of" Books

Books about films
Animation books
Books about visual art
Series of books